Chakdouf is a municipality in the district of Akkar, Lebanon. In 2021, solar panels and solar water heating systems were installed in Chaqdouf and Akkar al-Atika.

References

Populated places in Akkar Governorate
Akkar District